Leiosaurus catamarcensis is a species of lizard in the family Leiosauridae. It is native to Argentina.

References

Leiosaurus
Reptiles described in 1898
Reptiles of Argentina
Taxa named by Julio Germán Koslowsky